The Urbeleskarspitze is a 2,632-metre-high mountain peak in the Allgäu Alps. It lies within Austria in the state of Tyrol and is the fifth-highest summit in the Allgäu Alps and the second-highest peak in the Hornbach chain. Its neighbours in the Hornbach chain are the  Bretterspitze to the southwest and the Zwölfer Spitze to the northeast.

Rock and structure 
Like most of the high mountains in the Allgäu Alps the Urbeleskarspitze consists of main dolomite. Its summit has a striking bell-shaped appearance and is easily identified from the north and south from nearby and more distant summits.

First ascent 
Who first climbed the Urbeleskarspitze cannt be precisely determined. Candidates include unknown locals or a "Dr. Gümbel" in 1854. It was certainly ascended in 1869 by Hermann von Barth.

Bases 
The main starting point for ascents is the village of Hinterhornbach in a side valley of the Tyrolean  Lechtal. From there it is roughly 2½ hours to the  Kaufbeurer Haus, a self-service hut belonging to the DAV. The hut is regularly manned at weekends from Pentecost to early October but is otherwise only open to members of the  Alpine Club with a key.

Ascent 
There is no simple way leading to the summit of the Urbeleskarspitze. The two usable routes from the Kaufbeurer Haus require sure-footedness, a head for heights and Alpine experience and climbing preparedness.

The only partially marked normal route is graded as UIAA II+ and takes just under 2 hours through steep schrofen terrain over the northwest flank to reach the top.

An alternative climb existed over the north arête. It was a UIAA grade II and ran through broken rock, also taking 2 hours to reach the summit of the Urbeleskarspitze.

References

Literature/ Maps 
 
 
 Alpine Club map 2/2 Allgäuer-Lechtaler Alpen – Ost 1:25,000 map series, 7th edition, 2002

External links 

 Tour report

Two-thousanders of Austria
Mountains of the Alps
Mountains of Tyrol (state)
Allgäu Alps